Bohdan Ejmont (18 January 1928 – 28 February 2010) was a Polish actor. He appeared in more than 40 films and television shows between 1950 and 2002.

Selected filmography
 Shadow (1956)
 Three Steps on Earth (1965)
 Westerplatte (1967)
 Czterdziestolatek (1974)

References

External links

1928 births
2010 deaths
Polish male film actors
Recipients of the Order of Polonia Restituta
Recipient of the Meritorious Activist of Culture badge